Montenegro has sent athletes to every World Aquatics Championships since the country's debut in 2007.

List of medalists

Participation table

References 

 
Nations at the World Aquatics Championships
World Aquatics Championships